The Gran Canaria Lopesan Open was a professional golf tournament held 22–25 April 2021 at Meloneras Golf in Gran Canaria, Spain.

The tournament was intended to be a one-off event and was played the week before the Tenerife Open, after that event was rescheduled following the postponement of the Portugal Masters, creating a two-week swing of events in the Canary Islands.

On 5 April 2021, it was announced that Rafa Cabrera-Bello would host the event.

Garrick Higgo won the event with an aggregate score of 255. This broke the European Tour aggregate scoring record, beating Andy Sullivan's record of 257 previously set in 2020.

Winners

References

External links
Event page on the official site of the European Tour

Former European Tour events
Golf tournaments in Spain
Sport in Gran Canaria
2021 establishments in Spain